Semidalis is a genus of insects belonging to the family Coniopterygidae.

The genus has almost cosmopolitan distribution.

Species:
 Semidalis absurdiceps (Enderlein, 1908) 
 Semidalis africana Enderlein, 1906

References

Coniopterygidae
Neuroptera genera